Samoa vs Tonga in rugby league is a rivalry between the Samoa national rugby league team and the Tonga national rugby league team in the sport of rugby league. The two sides first met at the 1986 Pacific Cup, where Tonga came out as 34–16 victors. The two sides have faced each other 20 times, Tonga winning twelve times, Samoa winning seven times and on one occasion, their matchup was a draw.

In irregular occurrences, the teams face off in the Polynesian Cup.

Head to Head

Results

1980s

1990s

2000s

2010s

References

External links 

 Tonga vs Samoa – Tests – Rugby League Project
 Tonga vs Samoa – Internationals – Rugby League Project

Rugby league rivalries
Samoa national rugby league team
Tonga national rugby league team